Lentera Merah (English translation: Red Lantern) is a 2006 Indonesian horror film directed by Hanung Bramantyo.

Plot
An employee of Lentera Merah, the campus newspaper of the University of Indonesia, is found dead in the office with the number 65 written in blood by his body. In the meantime, five students compete for a position at the publication: Risa Priliyanti (Laudya Cynthia Bella), Riki (Tesadesrada Ryza), Lia (Beauty Oehmke), Muti (Auxilia Paramitha) and Yoga (Zainal Arifin).

As part of their entrance test, they must cover supposedly haunted portions of the university campus. Another Lentera Merah staff member, Wulan (Firrina Sinatrya) is found hanged in the library. The rector forbids the test after these murders are known, but chief editor Iqbal (Dimas Beck) insists that the five students go through the initiation rites to show their mettle as journalists. Lia and Risa go with staff photographer Bayu (Saputra).

After several more staff members are killed, it is discovered that Risa is in fact the ghost of a former Lentera Merah staff member who was killed in 1965 after being accused of being a communist sympathiser; her body was later buried under the floor of one of the buildings. They realise that Risa is killing them because they are related to the staff members who killed her. Iqbal's father, a Lentera Merah staff member in 1965, comes to the campus to warn his son. As the remaining students leave to find Risa's body and give it a proper burial, Risa appears and strangles Iqbal's father. Having found closure, she vanishes.

Cast
 Laudya Chintya Bella as Risa
 Tesadesrada Riza as Riki
 Beauty Oehmke as Lia
 Auxilia Paramitha as Muti
 Zainal Ariffin as Yoga
 Firrina Sinatrya as Wulan
 Dimas Beck as Iqbal
 Saputra as Bayu

Production
Lentera Merah had a screenplay by Gina S. Noer. According to Evi Mariani of The Jakarta Post, the title is reminiscent of Soe Hok Gie's history of the Indonesian Communist Party, Di Bawah Lentera Merah (Beneath the Red Lantern).

Lentera Merah was directed by Hanung Bramantyo, a Yogyakarta-born director educated in Muhammadiyah schools in Yogyakarta. As his birthday fell the day after the anniversary of the 30 September Movement, suspected to have been led by communists, Bramantyo had long been interested in communism. His first short film, Tlutur, dealt with the party. For Lentera Merah, Bramantyo focused on the horror aspects of the story, showing only a ghost of a communist party member. He was dismissive of the results, saying that "like Musashi who once fought with only one hand, I [made the film] half-heartedly," Although most of Bramantyo's films were to the political right, Lentera Merah was to the left.

The film had a low budget but spent Rp. 15-20 million (US$2,000-2,500) for the make-up of one actor.

Release and reception
Lentera Merah was released in mid-May 2006, a period where Indonesian theatres were filled with local horror films. It was viewed by 300,000 persons.

A write-up in Tempo magazine called the film's historical research weak, and found that as a whole the combination of history and horror did not work well.

Awards
Lentera Merah was nominated for two Citra Awards at the 2006 Indonesian Film Festival but did not win any.

References

Bibliography

External links

2006 films
2006 horror films
2000s Indonesian-language films
Indonesian slasher films
Films directed by Hanung Bramantyo
Films set in Indonesia